Blue Jam was an ambient radio comedy programme created and directed by Chris Morris.

Blue Jam may also refer to:
Blue Jam (album), a 1995 album by Bonnie Pink
"Blue Rhythm Jam", single jazz tune by Stan Getz 1965
The Naked Ghost, Burp! and Blue Jam (1991), collection of short stories by Australian author Paul Jennings